Dictyonema hernandezii is a species of basidiolichen in the family Hygrophoraceae. Found in montane rainforests of Costa Rica, it was described as new to science in 2011. The specific epithet hernandezii honors Venezuelan lichenologist Jesús Hernández, who collected the type material.

References

hernandezii
Lichens described in 2011
Lichens of Central America
Lichen species
Taxa named by Robert Lücking
Basidiolichens